Kemal Aydın (19 January 1934 - 8 January 2019) was a former Turkish football player. He was nicknamed Kara Kemal meaning "courageous Kemal".

Early life
He was born in Derekışla village in Bala district of Ankara Province. His father was Hasan Aydın, one of the first butchers of Ankara. He studied in İnönü Primary school, Ankara Gazi Highschool and School Economics of Ankara.

He was married to Özden Aydın and father of two.

Professional life
In 1956, he began serving for Turkish recorder of deeds. But he moved to Ministry of Youth and Sports. He became the dean of the Sports Academy and general coordinator of Turkish Football Federation. He retired in 1985, but continued to serve as a consultant to the minister and as a representative of Turkish Football Federation in European cups. He also served as the chieftain of Turkish national team during the tournaments in South Korea and Oman.

Sports life
He began his football life in Ankara Barbaros team in 1951. Between 1956 and 1962 he played in Gençlerbirliği S.K. Although he had to quit active sports life after being injured, he became the  general captain of PTT Sports in 1967.

References 

1934 births
2019 deaths
Turkish footballers
People from Derekışla, Bala
Gençlerbirliği S.K. footballers
Association football defenders